ADB-PINACA is a cannabinoid designer drug that is an ingredient in some synthetic cannabis products. It is a potent agonist of the CB1 receptor and CB2 receptor with EC50 values of 0.52 nM and 0.88 nM respectively. Like MDMB-FUBINACA, this compound contains an amino acid residue of tert-leucine.

Side effects

ADB-PINACA has been linked to multiple hospitalizations and deaths due to its use.

Metabolism 
Nineteen ADB-PINACA major metabolites were identified in several incubations with cryopreserved human hepatocytes. Major metabolic reactions included pentyl hydroxylation, hydroxylation followed by oxidation (ketone formation), and glucuronidation.

Legality

ADB-PINACA is listed in the Fifth Schedule of the Misuse of Drugs Act (MDA) and therefore illegal in Singapore as of May 2015.

In the United States, it is a Schedule I controlled substance.

As of October 2015 ADB-PINACA is a controlled substance in China.

See also 

 5F-AB-PINACA
 5F-ADB
 5F-ADB-PINACA
 5F-AMB
 5F-APINACA
 AB-FUBINACA
 AB-CHFUPYCA
 AB-CHMINACA
 AB-PINACA
 ADB-BUTINACA
 ADB-CHMINACA
 ADB-HEXINACA
 ADB-FUBINACA
 ADB-P7AICA
 ADBICA
 APICA
 APINACA
 MDMB-CHMICA
 PX-3

References 

Cannabinoids
Designer drugs

Indazolecarboxamides
Tert-butyl compounds